David Neumark (1866–1924) was a German-American rabbi and professor of Jewish philosophy. He authored several notable works on Jewish philosophy and Jewish law, and served as a professor at Hebrew Union College in Cincinnati, Ohio.

Biography
Neumark was born in Shchyrets (Szczerzec), Galicia (present day Ukraine) and was married to Mrs Dora Turnheim Neumark (1878-1959). Their children were Salomea (Sally) Brainin, Martha Neumark Montor, and Immanuel K. Neumark.

Neumark's daughter Martha (1904–1981) was a notable early figure in the history of women's ordination as rabbis. Neumark was widely reported to be the first Jewish woman to be accepted into a rabbinical school.

Prior to his move to the United States, Neumark served as the rabbi in Rakovník and received his doctorate from the University of Berlin. In 1907, Hebrew Union College President Kaufmann Kohler appointed Neumark to the college faculty where he became chair of philosophy and served until his death in 1924.

In 1919, Neumark served as the founding editor of a scholarly quarterly Journal of Jewish Lore and Philosophy. The journal was later renamed The Hebrew Union College Annual.

Views 
Neumark viewed that elements mythology and irrationalism were always present within Judaism, and considered that Kabbalah emerged in the twelfth and thirteenth century in response to the cultural and religious atmosphere created by Jewish rationalism. Kabbalah then transformed philosophical terminology into mystical symbols.

Neumark supported the ordination of women as rabbis, and supported his daughter Martha Neumark to study for the rabbinate.

Selected works 
 Neumark, D. (1907-1910). Geschichte der Judischen Philosophie des Mittelalters, Berlin: G. Reimer. 2 Vols. (later translated to Hebrew as Toledot ha-Filosofyah be-Yisrael).
 Neumark, D. (1908). Jehuda Hallevi's Philosophy in Its Principles. Cincinnati: Hebrew Union College Press.
 Neumark, D. (1918). The Philosophy of the Bible. Ark Publishing Company.
 Neumark, D. (1929). Essays in Jewish Philosophy. New York: Central Conference of American Rabbis.

See also 
 Jacob Zallel Lauterbach

References 

1924 deaths
1866 births
People from Galicia (Eastern Europe)
Reform rabbis
Hebrew Union College – Jewish Institute of Religion faculty